Tibetan may mean:
 of, from, or related to Tibet
 Tibetan people, an ethnic group
 Tibetan language:
 Classical Tibetan, the classical language used also as a contemporary written standard
 Standard Tibetan, the most widely used spoken dialect
 Tibetan pinyin, a method of writing Standard Tibetan in Latin script
 Tibetan script
 any other of the Tibetic languages

Tibetan may additionally refer to:

Culture
 Old Tibetan, an era of Tibetan history
 Tibetan art
 Music of Tibet
 Tibetan rug
 Tibetan culture
 Tibetan cuisine

Religion
 Tibetan Buddhism
 Tibetan Muslims

Other uses
 Tibetan alphabet
 Tibetan (Unicode block)
 Tibetan name
 Tibetan calendar
 Tibetan Spaniel, a breed of dog
 Tibetan Mastiff, a breed of dog

See also
 Tibet (disambiguation)
 Tibetan Bells (disambiguation)
 Traditional Tibetan medicine
 Tibetan language (disambiguation)

Language and nationality disambiguation pages